The Prime Minister's Office (PMO; , JPM) is the leading and largest cabinet-level ministry in the government of Brunei. It serves as the immediate office of the country's prime minister, as well as oversees several key government departments. It was established immediately upon Brunei's independence on 1 January 1984, with Hassanal Bolkiah, the current Sultan of Brunei, being the first and only Prime Minister to date. The leadership also consists of a Senior Minister, introduced in 2005 and has since been held by the Crown Prince Al-Muhtadee Billah, a Special Advisor to His Majesty, as well as a few in-house ministers and deputy ministers.

The ministry is located in Bandar Seri Begawan with two headquarters, one located at Istana Nurul Iman and another at a building at Jalan Perdana Menteri.

Portfolio 
The ministry oversees the largest portfolio in the cabinet with 19 departments. They include:

 Audit Department — office of the country's auditor general
 Anti-Corruption Bureau (BMR) — the country's anti-corruption agency
 Attorney General's Chambers (AGC) — office of the country's attorney general
 Brunei Research Department
 Civil Service Institute (IPA)
 Councils of State Department — oversees the Legislative Council, Council of Cabinet Ministers and Privy Council
 Energy Department — oversees the country's energy sector including the petroleum industry. It was formerly a separate ministry from 2018 until 2022.
 Internal Security Department (KDN) — responsible for the country's internal security
 Information Department — known for publishing of the government newspaper Pelita Brunei
 Manpower and Employment Council (MPEC) – established in 2020, it is responsible for addressing the country's unemployment issues
 Narcotics Control Bureau (BKN) — responsible for combatting the smuggling and spread of narcotics in the country
 Public Service Commission (SPA) — a constitutional body responsible for civil service appointments, promotions and discipline
 Public Service Department (JPA)
 Radio Television Brunei (RTB) — the country's sole public broadcaster
  (JAIN) — oversees the state and royal customs and ceremonies
 Royal Brunei Police Force — the country's police
 State Mufti Department — office of the state mufti, who has the authority to issue state fatwas
 State Judiciary Department — oversees the country's civil and sharia courts

Budget 
The allocated budget for the fiscal year 2022–23 is about B$385 million, a 10.8 percent decrease from the previous fiscal year.

Notes

References

External links 
 

Government ministries of Brunei
Ministries established in 1984
1984 establishments in Brunei